Luis Javier Gamíz Ávila (born 4 April 2000) is a Mexican professional footballer who plays as a midfielder.

Career statistics

Club

Honours
Mexico U17
CONCACAF U-17 Championship: 2017

References

2000 births
Living people
Mexican footballers
Association football midfielders
Club Tijuana footballers
Liga MX players
Tercera División de México players
Footballers from Baja California
Sportspeople from Tijuana
Mexico youth international footballers